The Boeing C-32 is the United States Air Force designation for variants of the Boeing 757 in military service. Two variants exist, filling different parts of the military passenger transport role. The C-32A serves the Special Air Mission, providing executive transport and broad communications capabilities to senior political officials, while the C-32B Gatekeeper provides clandestine airlift to special operations and global emergency response efforts, a role known as "covered air".

The primary users of the C-32A are the vice president of the United States (using the call sign "Air Force Two" when aboard), the first lady, and the secretary of state. On occasion, other members of the president's Cabinet and members of Congress have flown aboard the C-32A for various missions. The aircraft also occasionally serves as Air Force One in place of the larger VC-25A when the president is traveling to domestic destinations that cannot accommodate the larger Boeing 747-derived presidential plane or if the latter is simply unavailable. The C-32A was used to accommodate President Biden for his transatlantic journey prior to visiting Ukraine in February 2023 to limit suspicions of his presence aboard the plane, a trip which would normally be operated by a VC-25.

Little is known of the activities of the secretive C-32B, whose existence is not widely acknowledged by the Air Force. Outfitted for utility rather than luxury, the heavily modified aircraft were acquired to support the U.S. State Department's Foreign Emergency Support Team, and have ties to special operations, and the U.S. Intelligence Community.

C-32A

Development
The C-32A is the military designation for the Boeing 757-2G4, a variant of the Boeing 757-200, a mid-size, narrow-body twin-engine jet airliner—that has been modified for government VIP transport use, including a change to a 45-passenger interior and military avionics. A contract was awarded in August 1996 for four aircraft supplemented by the smaller C-37A and later C-40 Clipper to replace the aging fleet of VC-137 aircraft. The first plane was delivered to the 89th Airlift Wing at Andrews Air Force Base, Maryland in late June 1998. Additional aircraft were acquired later.

Conversion of 98-0001 

The first C-32A, 98-0001, (MSN 29025/783) was originally constructed as a C-32B while Boeing tried to market the plane to meet a variety of different US government requirements. The government ultimately purchased four VIP configuration C-32A aircraft prior to ordering the B variant, so 98-0001 was refitted and delivered to the USAF as the first C-32A, June 1, 1998.

Equipment and capabilities 
The C-32As are painted in the blue and white livery, vertical stabilizer flag, and prominent "UNITED STATES OF AMERICA" cheatline markings developed by Raymond Loewy at the behest of President Kennedy for use on Air Force One. The design is shared with most Special Air Mission aircraft. The aircraft have appeared with tail numbers 98-0001, 98-0002, 99-0003, 99-0004, 09-0015, 09-0016, and 09-0017. All of the C-32A's are fitted with Pratt & Whitney PW2000 engines, which are also used on the C-17 Globemaster III. The planes are also fitted with winglets for added fuel economy.

Appearance upgrades 

Throughout the Obama, Trump, and Biden administrations, the interiors of the C-32As were slowly refit with more luxurious accommodations, at a cost of $16 million per aircraft. Officially, the work was requested by the Air Force, and is being completed by a division of Boeing at Air Force facilities in Oklahoma. The retrofit includes upgraded and refurbished interior elements throughout, new carpets, lighting, leather seats and wood tables in place of cloth and formica, a complete painting and cleaning, and the replacement of the double-seat configuration with a triple-seat configuration, aft of Door 3. The refit is controversial, with critics describing the spending as "posh" and "wasteful" and an effort to create "flying palaces", noting that the aircraft are well into the back half of their service lives. The War Zone observed that the spending appears to have little to do with the ability of the aircraft to accomplish its mission, noting that the C-32A's have been continuously upgraded with improved communications, avionics, and countermeasures throughout their service lives without criticism.

Operational history
The four C-32As are operated by the 1st Airlift Squadron of the 89th Airlift Wing. They are available for use by the vice-president (using call sign Air Force Two), the first lady, and members of the Cabinet and Congress (using SAM callsigns). They are also used by the president (using call sign Air Force One) if the destination is too small to support the larger VC-25A or when it’s simply unavailable.

Incidents 

Several C-32A's have suffered non-life-threatening equipment failures during VIP flight operations which lead to aircraft returning to Andrews Air Force Base prematurely. In 2018, first lady Melania Trump and Health and Human Services secretary Alex Azar were aboard a C-32A flying to Philadelphia when smoke filled the cabin shortly after takeoff. Journalists aboard reported being given wet towels to shield their faces from the smoke, and the flight returned to Andrews without further incident. In 2021, vice president Kamala Harris was aboard a C-32A en route to Guatemala when the aircraft was forced to make an emergency return to Andrews over an unspecified equipment failure which delayed the trip but left all passengers and crew unharmed.

Replacement

The Trump administration included $6 million in its 2018 federal budget proposal to study replacements for the aging C-32A. In June 2021, Pentagon leaders in the Biden administration cut funding for the study from its fiscal 2022 budget request. Said Air Force General Jacqueline Van Ovost, head of Air Mobility Command, the C-32A is still "a very capable aircraft... right now, we are not moving forward." Instead, the Air Force redirected the nominal amount of funding to research and development contracts for three American startup companies: Exosonic and Boom Supersonic, which are developing supersonic passenger jets; and Hermeus, which is developing a hypersonic passenger aircraft. Budget documents state the revised investment “will bolster evaluation and maturation of advanced high speed transport scale aircraft with potential to expand the defense industrial base and serve as C-32A replacements at the appropriate time.” All three programs are many years away from delivery of production aircraft.

The C-32A is not planned to leave Air Mobility Command service until 2040; however, discussion of the aircraft's age has continued, prompted by high-profile reliability issues. For the duration the C-32A will remain in the fleet, the Air Force will not pursue investment in the airframe beyond already planned modifications, according to the service's fiscal 2022 budget request. Boeing (the sole producer which can fulfill Buy American Act purchasing restrictions for government passenger aircraft) has neglected the middle of the market since the 757 was discontinued in 2004, repeatedly shelving upgrade plans since 2014. In 2021, the company announced a clean sheet restart of plans for a successor aircraft, slated to enter service in the late 2020s.

C-32B Gatekeeper

Role

The 45-seat C-32B Gatekeeper provides airlift to the U.S. government's Gate Keeper (GK) mission, a special access program which provides clandestine support to foreign nations through State Department Foreign Emergency Support Team missions and classified special operations and intelligence missions. The aircraft are operated by two different units, the New Jersey Air National Guard's 150th Special Operations Squadron at Joint Base McGuire-Dix-Lakehurst, New Jersey, and the 486th Flight Test Squadron at Eglin Air Force Base, Florida. The C-32Bs operate at the direction of the Commander of U.S. Special Operations Command, though when serving a civilian agency, approval for the use of the aircraft is on the recommendation of the committee of Deputy Secretaries of Defense with the consent of the Secretary of Defense. The development of the two aircraft emerged from the 2001 Air Force budget, where they were procured for $144.963 million to fill an Air Force request for transportation capabilities for the Foreign and Domestic Emergency Support Teams. The Gate Keeper mission predates the aircraft, which are successors to previous fleets based on other models of aircraft. The planes have been spotted throughout the world, including such locations as Area 51 and the Tonopah Test Range. The C-32B became known during the George W. Bush administration for unsubstantiated theories which circulated that they were connected to the CIA's extraordinary rendition flights, giving them the onetime nickname “torture taxi.”

Equipment and capabilities 

The C-32Bs serve as on-call global transport, and are variants of the 757, designated the 757-023A, which differ significantly from their VIP-carrying counterparts, outfitted with advanced communications and designed for ultra long-range capability. The craft also have an aerial refueling capability via an unmarked, unilluminated conformal Universal Aerial Refueling Receptacle Slipway Installation (UARRSI) located atop the fuselage,  behind the cockpit windows, allowing the planes to remain airborne nearly indefinitely. The aircraft are also fitted with an airstair allowing passengers to deplane without access to a jet bridge or stair truck, a heavy and uncommon modification in modern commercial aviation. For additional support in austere environments, the aircraft are also fitted with a winch-based baggage loading system, designed to load baggage at airfields that do not have adequate material handling equipment available.   

In 2014, the C-32Bs received audio and visual equipment upgrades, in addition to installation of upgraded satellite communications systems and secure Ku bandwidth communications management systems to replace commercial-grade Inmarsat installations, in use since 2002. Around the same time, the craft acquired an additional protruding faring on the roof of the rear of the craft. Similar modifications have appeared on the C-32As, the presidential VC-25A’s, the E-4B and E-6 “doomsday planes”, and the E-11A BACN. The protrusion reportedly houses Northrop Grumman’s Multi-Role Tactical Common Data Link (MR-TCDL), a Ka and Ku band telecommunications suite designed for war zones but which has proved to be just as relevant over a disaster zone as a battlefield. The system functions as a flying wireless router and server, providing communications where traditional communications infrastructure is unavailable. Budget requests show that around 2016 the cockpit avionics were upgraded to include heads up displays. Depot level maintenance on the C-32B is performed by Big Safari (the 645th Aeronautical Systems Squadron).

According to Air Force Manual 11-2C-32B (2020), at least two members of the C-32B aircrew are always armed.

Airframes

There are two C-32B aircraft as of 2021: 00-9001 and 02-4452. At times the Air National Guard has appeared to deny the existence of one of the two aircraft. The 2012 edition of the National Guard's Weapons System Modernization Priorities report states "the 150th Special Operations Squadron of the New Jersey Air National Guard operates the C-32B from Joint Base McGuire-Dix-Lakehurst, NJ and is the only U.S Air Force C-32B", while all prior and successive editions describe a need to support upgrades to two aircraft. Both planes are painted gloss white, and lack any recognizable external markings other than serial numbers, although they have been spotted with "United States Air Force" emblazoned on the cheatline and the Air Force roundel on the tail section of the fuselage at times, and solely a small American flag on the same area of the rear fuselage at other times. There are only two identified visual differences between the two aircraft: one has larger emergency ramp openings under the doorsills, and one has the rearward window removed from the forward bank of windows on the starboard side. Both planes are known for adopting a range of different serial numbers on a regular basis to confuse their activities and identities. Numbers appearing on the aircraft in the past have included: 00-9001, 98-6006, 99-6143, 02-5001, and 02-4452.

The true identity of the older of the two aircraft is MSN 25493/523 (02-4452), originally delivered to Ansett Worldwide as N59AW on 26 February 1993, it saw service with ATA airlines as 84WA before shuffling through private brokers, and ultimately being sold to the Air Force by Kodiak Associates LLC in 2000. The later aircraft is MSN 25494/611 (00-9001), delivered to Avianca as N987AN on April 22, 1994, it passed through the hands of Raytheon E-Systems before Air Force purchase in 2001 Both aircraft are powered by Rolls-Royce RB211 engines, rather than the Pratt & Whitney PW2000 used on the C-32A.
Sparsely marked secretive white 757s often conflated with the C-32B include N226G and N610G, a pair of 757's operated by  L3Harris subsidiary L-3 Capital. The aircraft have been observed operating with various tail numbers, and previously featured the text "COMCO" in prominent black lettering on the tail, later replaced by a conservative blue swoosh design. The near identical equipment of the so-called COMCO aircraft, including airstair, Rolls-Royce engines, roof communications faring, and an unexplained rectangular modification applied to the fuselage of both aircraft have fueled rumors that they are in fact C-32B's with hasty paint or decals applied, however such claims have never been substantiated. Other similar aircraft include N119NA and N874TW, a pair of 757s based at Richmond International Airport, acquired by the U.S. Department of Justice in 2015 displaying an American flag on their tail and are distinguished from the C-32B by their winglets.

Operators

 C-32A
 United States Air Force
89th Airlift Wing
 1st Airlift Squadron – Joint Base Andrews, Maryland
 C-32B
United States Air Force
96th Test Wing
486th Flight Test Squadron – Eglin Air Force Base, Florida
 New Jersey Air National Guard
 108th Wing
 150th Special Operations Squadron – Joint Base McGuire–Dix–Lakehurst, New Jersey

Specifications

C-32A

C-32B

See also

References

External links

 U.S. Air Force C-32 factsheet. US Air Force, 12 May 2015.
Footage of a C-32B being refueled in flight

C-132
1990s United States military transport aircraft
Twinjets
Boeing 757
Aircraft first flown in 1998